A safety valve is a mechanism for the release of a substance from a pressurized vessel when the pressure or temperature exceeds preset limits.

Safety valve may also refer to:

 Safety valve (law), a provision in the United States Federal Sentencing Guidelines
 Safety valve theory, relating unemployment and the Homestead Act of 1862
 Safety-valve institution, a term used in sociology to describe organizations which serve to prevent tensions from accumulating in a society
 Safety Valve (Biscayne Bay), a structure of sand flats and tidal channels separating Biscayne Bay in Florida from the Atlantic Ocean
 Safety valve, a method for managing Emissions trading
 Safety shutoff valve, a device to close a line and stop the flow of material
 Downhole safety valve, a shutoff device in a gas or oil well
 An oral inflation valve that does not let the air out unless, for example, the valve stem is pinched.

See also
Relief valve